John Sydney Ryan (born 23 February 1944) is an Australian sprint freestyle swimmer of the 1960s, who won a bronze medal in the 4×100-metre freestyle relay at the 1964 Summer Olympics in Tokyo.

The West Australian combined with Bob Windle, David Dickson and Peter Doak to win Bronze in the 4 × 100 m  freestyle relay, behind the United States and German teams, the first time this event had been contested at the Olympics.  He also made the semifinals of the 100-metre freestyle.  Ryan later took gold in the  freestyle relayfreestyle relay at the 1966 Commonwealth Games in Kingston, Jamaica, and finished fourth in the 110-yard freestyle event.

See also
 List of Commonwealth Games medallists in swimming (men)
 List of Olympic medalists in swimming (men)

References
 

1944 births
Living people
Olympic swimmers of Australia
Sportsmen from Western Australia
Swimmers at the 1964 Summer Olympics
Olympic bronze medalists for Australia
Western Australian Sports Star of the Year winners
People educated at Wesley College, Perth
Olympic bronze medalists in swimming
Australian male freestyle swimmers
Medalists at the 1964 Summer Olympics
Swimmers at the 1966 British Empire and Commonwealth Games
Commonwealth Games medallists in swimming
Commonwealth Games gold medallists for Australia
Place of birth missing (living people)
20th-century Australian people
Medallists at the 1966 British Empire and Commonwealth Games